The 2019 Allan Cup was the Canadian championship of senior ice hockey and the 111th year the Allan Cup was awarded.  The tournament played in Lacombe, Alberta from April 8–13, 2019.  The Lacombe Generals defeated the Innisfail Eagles 5–2 in the final to win the national championship.

Information
Hockey Canada named the Lacombe Generals and city of Lacombe, Alberta and the host team and city of the 2019 Allan Cup on January 17, 2018.  The Generals previously hosted the 2013 Allan Cup in Red Deer.

Participants
Lacombe Generals (Host)
2009, 2013, and 2016 Allan Cup champions (as Bentley Generals).
10-6-2 record, 1st in ACHW
Defeated Stony Plain Eagles 3-1; defeated Innisfail Eagles 3-0 to win league.
Innisfail Eagles (Pacific)
9-8-1 record, 3rd in ACHW.
Defeated Rosetown Redwings 3-1; defeated by Lacombe Generals 3-0 in league playoffs.
Automatically advance as British Columbia will not present a champion for McKenzie Cup and Lacombe Generals qualified as host team.
Rosetown Redwings (Saskatchewan)
6-11-1 record, 4th in ACHW
Defeated by Innisfail Eagles 3-0 in league playoffs.
Advance by default as only team in Saskatchewan.
South East Prairie Thunder (Manitoba)
2012 and 2015 Allan Cup champions.
Defeated Ste. Anne Aces 3-0 to win Pattison Cup series.
Stoney Creek Generals (Ontario)
 2018 Allan Cup champions.
18-5-1 record, 1st in ACH
Defeated Dundas Real McCoys 4-1, defeated Whitby Dunlops 4-games-to-0 to win league.
Automatically advanced as Northwestern Ontario did not present a champion for Renwick Cup.
Haut-Madawaska Panthers (Atlantic)
21-5-2 record, 1st in CHSRL
Defeated Témiscouata Predators 4-2; defeated by St-Quentin Castors 4-3 in league playoffs.
Automatically advance as 2018 champions and no other Atlantic provinces will participate in this year's Allan Cup playoffs.

Round robin

Full standings and statistics available at Pointstreak.com.

Results

Championship Round

Quarter and Semi-finals

Final

References

External links
Official Allan Cup Site 
Allan Cup Site at HockeyCanada.ca

2018–19 in Canadian ice hockey
April 2019 sports events in Canada
2019 Allan Cup
2019 in Alberta
Ice hockey competitions in Alberta